Aldisa benguelae is a species of sea slug, a dorid nudibranch, a marine gastropod mollusk in the family Cadlinidae.

Distribution
The holotype of this species was collected at Bakoven, South Africa, at 20 m depth. A paratype was collected at Hottentot’s Huissie, South Africa, 20 m depth.

References

Cadlinidae
Gastropods described in 1985